Sailing (as Yachting) was contested at the 1978 Asian Games in Pattaya Bay, Pattaya, Thailand in December 1978. There were four events in the competition.

Japan topped the medal table with two gold medals.

Medalists

Medal table

References 
 Asian Games medalists
 Results

External links 
 Olympic Council of Asia

 
1978 Asian Games events
1978
Asian Games
Sailing competitions in Thailand